Health in Uganda refers to the health of the population of Uganda. The average life expectancy at birth of Uganda has increased from 59.9 years in 2013 to 63.4 years in 2019. This is lower than in any other country in the East African Community except Burundi. As of 2017, females had a life expectancy higher than their male counterparts of 69.2 versus 62.3. It is projected that by 2100, males in Uganda will have an expectancy of 74.5 and females 83.3. Uganda's population has steadily increased from 36.56 million in 2016 to an estimate of 42.46 in 2021. The fertility rate of Ugandan women slightly increased from an average of 6.89 babies per woman in the 1950s to about 7.12 in the 1970s before declining to an estimate 5.32 babies in 2019. This figure is higher than most world regions including South East Asia, Middle East and North Africa, Europe and Central Asia and America. The under-5-mortality-rate for Uganda has decreased from 191 deaths per 1000 live births in 1970 to 45.8 deaths per 1000 live births in 2019.

Total health expenditure as a percentage of gross domestic product (GDP) was 7.2 percent in 2014.

In 2018, an estimated 1.4 million people in Uganda were infected with HIV, and the HIV prevalence rate in the country was 5.7 percent. As of 2019, this number had increased to an estimate of 1.5 million people living with HIV. Uganda has made substantial progress in control of the epidemic as 1.3 of the confirmed HIV infected population was aware of their serostatus and 1.2 million were already on treatment.

Physical activity

Uganda was the most physically active nation in the world in 2018 according to the World Health Organization. Only 5.5% of Ugandans do not achieve 150 minutes of moderate-to-intense or 75 minutes of rigorous activity per week. Most work is still very physical, and commuting by vehicle is beyond the reach of most of the population.  Kampala, however, is not friendly towards walking or cycling, and the air is very polluted. The Kampala Capital City Authority established the country's first cycle lane—500 metres in Kololo—in 2018.

Common illnesses and treatments 

As of 2016, the five leading causes of death in Uganda included communicable diseases such as HIV/AIDS, tuberculosis, malaria, respiratory tract infections, and diarrheal diseases. The risk factors most responsible for death and disability include child and maternal malnutrition, unprotected sexual activity, multiple sex partners, contaminated water, poor sanitation, and air pollution.

HIV treatment in Uganda has centered on human antiretroviral therapy through cross-training and increasing the scope of health workers who can administer treatment (e.g., community health workers and nurses). This shift in treatment occurred through the WHO's 2004 "Integrated Management of Adult and Adolescent Illness" guide. Studies of HIV-infected adults in Uganda showed risky sexual behavior to have declined, contributing to the decline in HIV incidence. From 1990 to 2004, HIV rates declined by 70 percent and casual sex declined by 60 percent. Health communication was also listed as a potential cause of inducing behavioral changes in the Ugandan population. According to a 2015 study, impediments to reducing HIV incidence include food insecurity in rural areas and stigma against HIV counseling and testing.

Uganda has the highest incidence rate of malaria in the world, with 478 people out of 1000 population being afflicted per year. According to WHO data published in May 2014, malaria accounted for 19,869 deaths in Uganda (6.19% of total deaths).

In 2002, the Ugandan government formalized the process of treating fevers through home-based care. Mothers who were able to better recognize symptoms of malaria took their children to a community medicine facility early in the illness. The Integrated Management of Childhood Illness allowed for better recognition of malaria's symptoms. Treatment either involved immediately taking the child to see a nearby healthcare worker or acquiring the treatment of chloroquine and SP, also known as Homapak, though kits have been found to be expired in some instances. However, resistance to HOMAPAK emerged, and drug recommendations by the WHO changed to artemisinin combination therapy (ACT). After the midterm review in 2014 of the national plan for malaria reduction and the malaria programme review in 2010, the national strategy to reduce malaria is being redesigned. Currently, Uganda is treating malaria through distribution of insecticide-treated nets, indoor spraying of insecticides, and preventative therapy for pregnant women. The disease burden of malaria, however, remains high and is further strengthened by inadequate resources, understanding of malaria, and increased resistance to drugs.

Reproductive health

Reproductive health (RH) is a state of complete physical, mental, and social well-being in all matters relating to the reproductive system and to its functions and processes. It implies that people have the capability to reproduce and the freedom to decide if, when, and how often to do so. Implicit in this is the right of men and women to be informed and to have access to safe, effective, affordable, and acceptable methods of family planning of their choice, as well as other methods of their choice for regulation of fertility, which are not against the law, and the right of access to health care services that will enable women to go safely through pregnancy and childbirth. RH care also includes sexual health, the purpose of which is the enhancement of life and personal relations.

The World Health Organization (WHO) defines maternal health as the health of women during pregnancy, childbirth, and the postpartum period. According to UNICEF, Uganda's maternal mortality ratio, the annual number of deaths of women from pregnancy-related causes per 100,000 live births, was 440 from 2008 to 2012. The Millennium Development Goal (MDG) for 2015 concerning the maternal mortality ratio was 131 per 100,000 births. The MDG also set a goal for all births to be attended by a skilled health professional,

In rural areas, conceiving pregnant women seek the help of traditional birth attendants (TBAs) because of the difficulty in accessing formal health services and high transportation or treatment costs. TBAs are trusted as they embody the cultural and social life of the community. The TBAs' lack of knowledge and training and the use of traditional practices, however, have led to risky medical procedures resulting in high maternal mortality rates. Those rates also persist because of an overall low use of contraceptives, the limited capacity of health facilities to manage abortion/miscarriage complications, and the prevalence of HIV/AIDS among pregnant women. Despite malaria being one of the leading causes of morbidity in pregnant women, prevention and prophylaxis services are not well established according to a 2013 published report.

Only 47 percent of Ugandan women receive the recommended four antenatal care visits, and only 42 percent of births are attended by skilled health personnel. Among the poorest 20 percent of the population, the share of births attended by skilled health personnel was 29 percent in 2005/2006 compared to 77 percent among the wealthiest 20 percent of the population. The Human Rights Measurement Initiative has given Uganda a score of 47.9% for contraceptive use.

Malnutrition
Malnutrition is a major development concern in Uganda, affecting all regions of the country and most segments of the population. The current levels of malnutrition hinder Uganda's human, social, and economic development. Although the country has made tremendous progress in economic growth and poverty reduction over the past 20 years, its progress in reducing malnutrition remains very slow. The ultimate objective of the Uganda Nutrition Action Plan
(UNAP) is to ensure that all Ugandans are properly nourished so they can live healthy and productive lives. However, it is at the start of life in particular that we must work together to ensure that all Ugandans are properly nourished.
According to the three most recent Uganda Demographic Health Surveys (UDHS), nutrition indicators for young children and their mothers have not improved much over the past 15 years, with some indicators showing a worsening trend. For example, in 1995, 45 percent of children under five years old in Uganda were short for their age (stunted); 10 years later, the prevalence of stunted under-fives had fallen to only 39 percent (UDHS, 2006). Stunting indicates
chronic malnutrition in children; the stunting prevalence rate of 39 percent means that about 2.3 million young children in Uganda today are chronically malnourished. UNICEF The Human Rights Measurement Initiative gives Uganda a score of 79.5% for stunted children.

Consider the nutrition profile of Uganda for children under five years of age as per USAID

This has a huge burden on the country through lost income that directly affects the GDP where as much as 5.6% or US$899 million is lost annually. WFP

Despite the worrying numbers, latest research shows that the numbers of children under five suffering from malnutrition are declining.

Gender based violence
Domestic violence (DV) is a key issue in reproductive health and rights. Most of the DV is gender-based. Physical violence is the most prevalent type of DV in Uganda, with one quarter of women reporting it. More than 60 percent of women who have ever been married have reported experiencing emotional, physical, or sexual violence from a spouse.

In 2011, about two percent of women reported to have undergone female genital mutilation, a practice that is dying away in the areas where it was more frequently practiced.

Substance and drug use 
Substance and drug abuse is a public health very big concern in Uganda affecting both the child and adolescent populations. A drug commonly used among the youth is cocaine.

As of 2019, substance use disorders account for 0.34% of total disability-adjusted-life-years (DALYs) and 0.13% deaths in Uganda. Alcohol use disorders account for 0.2% of DALYs and 0.11% of total deaths. This is relatively low compared to countries in North Africa, Europe, North America and Central Asia regions. This may be a result of under reporting of these cases or failure to diagnose these disorders in Uganda.

Alcohol consumption in Uganda was reported high in the world at 26.0 L of alcohol per capita per year in 2016. In March 2013, a CNN study ranked Uganda 8th in the world in liquor intake and first on the African continent. A recent study in Uganda showed an unexpected discovery of alcohol abuse and dependence among 5-8-year-old children.  This was found during clinical interviews in a 2020 published article with a common phrase among the children, "I feel good when I drink."  In this study, 7.4% children scored positive for alcohol abuse and dependence. 10 out of 148 children had high Strengths and Difficulties Questionnaire (SDQ) scores (≥ 14). These 10 children that had high SDQ scores had mental health comorbidities which included suicide attempts (30%) and separation anxiety disorders (50%). Only one child had a lower SDQ score (below 14) had no comorbidities despite a positive drinking experience. Most children reported access to homemade brew, caretaker's knowledge on drinking and difficult household situations that prompted them to take alcohol. In 2016, Uganda registered the highest number of deaths from alcohol-related liver disease with a total of 118 deaths per 100,000 from liver disease secondary to excessive alcohol consumption.

The legal regulations on alcohol in Uganda had not been updated since 1960 as of 2016 with a legal age of alcohol consumption being 18 years while alcohol sales to minors' penalty is a fine not exceeding USh ($0.14) and children are allowed to buy alcohol on behalf of the adults. A key issue on alcohol consumption in Uganda is that the alcohol industry has targeted young people through an increase in packaging of 30 ml alcohol tots/ packs that are readily accessible to any Ugandan youth at only  ($0.057) with ongoing massive alcohol campaigns close to schools, kindergartens, media platforms, and along Ugandan roads. The Uganda National Bureau of Standards (UNBS) Act which sets standards on Ugandan commodities hasn't any standards on native liquor (commonly called "enguli"). On September 26, 2016, a new alcohol control bill was drafted by a small committee and presented to the parliament of Uganda. This bill is aimed at banning small alcohol packaging, alcohol advertising and regulating alcohol consumption time. Additionally it includes raising legal age for alcohol consumption from 18 to 21 years and an imposition of a 5% tax on all alcohol beverages. The impact and policy changes plus law enforcement will help regulate alcohol consumption in Uganda and save the lives of many youth and children.

Oral Health 

There is inadequate data on the current oral health situation in Uganda. A rapid assessment conducted through a community survey and key informant interviews in Ugandan districts in 2004/2005 estimated that 51% of the community had experienced an oral health problem six months prior to the survey. Of the population that had experienced an oral health problem, only 35% had received treatment. The most prevalent conditions as reported by key informants included; 

According to a study carried out among school children in Mbarara in 2007, the oral hygiene of school children was generally poor showing a lack of well-established oral hygiene practices. The mean decayed, missed, filled permanent teeth (DMFT) was 1.5 (±0.8SD) with females having a higher DMFT than males of 1.6 (±0.8SD) and 1.3 (±0.8SD) respectively. Children in private schools were more likely to have more caries in both permanent teeth and milk teeth. Calculus was more prevalent in males, government schools and among day scholars. Caries experience is generally higher in Kampala as compared to the rural districts. Overall DMFT score was 0.9 for children and 3.4 for adults.

According to the Global Disease Burden, oral diseases in Uganda contribute 0.38% of total DALYs. This is lower than its neighboring countries in the East African community and much lower than the other bank regions world bank regions, i.e., East Asia and the Pacific, Europe and Central Asia, Latin America and the Caribbean and parts of South Asia.

Uganda is unique as it trains different cadres of oral health workers, dental surgeons, public health dental officers, oral and maxillofacial surgeons and dental laboratory technologists. The dental surgeons in Uganda are regulated by the Uganda Medical and Dental Practitioners' Council (UMDPC) and a professional body, Uganda Dental Association (UDA) The number of registered dental surgeons across the country has increased from 72 dental surgeons in 2006   to about 396 dental surgeons in 2021 serving a Ugandan population of more than 42 million.  Of these, 372 are general dental practitioners, 12 Oral and maxillofacial surgeons, 3 orthodontists, 2 prosthodontists and 7 restorative dentists across the entire country as of 2021. All the dental specialties except for oral and maxillofacial surgery are trained outside the country.

The National Oral Health policy has been running since 2007 through 2009 and has not yet been updated since. The Ministry of Health operates at a very low budgetary proportion covering less than 0.1% on oral health care which is suboptimal for adequate oral service delivery. The basic oral services are at a free cost at government facilities while second and tertiary care is received at a cost. Most dental care services in Uganda are out-of-pocket payments (OOPs) due to shortage of materials, supplies, equipment and manpower at most government health care units hence patients are forced to seek oral care at private facilities.

Infant oral mutilation (IOM) 

Infant oral mutilation is very common to most African countries in Sub- Saharan Africa, Uganda inclusive. Among the Bantu-speaking tribes in Uganda, it's commonly known as "ebinyo". The un-erupted tooth is gouged out usually as a cure for high fevers and diarrhea in infants by un-trained personnel. The practice involves identifying raised areas on the infants' gums and using sharp instruments to extract the soft non-mineralized tooth considering it the "offending worm." The common tooth buds removed are the primary canines.

Infant Oral mutilation (IOM) was first reported in Uganda in 1969 among 16.1% of children from the Acholi tribe in the Northern part of Uganda. These were all missing canines due to IOM. A recent study published in 2019 among 3-5-year-old children in the Western part of Uganda revealed 8.1% were missing primary canines due to IOM. This practice is more common among the rural populations versus the urban populations, with more prevalence in children under a caretaker other than a parent. The commonest groups reported to carry out IOM are culturally respected people in Uganda and these include; traditional healers, traditional midwives, school teachers and local priests. This practice is carried out at an age where the child's antibodies from breast milk and pregnancy are decreasing hence increased susceptibility to infections manifesting as fevers, diarrhea and vomiting that IOM is performed to treat. This leads to neglection of the primary cause of infections and instead exacerbates it through use of unsterile instruments leading to high morbidity and mortality among children.  The main cause of IOM is poor oral literacy among majority of the Ugandan population.

Health in the Northern Region

Northern Uganda is one of the four major administrative regions in Uganda. The region was devastated by a protracted civil war between the government of Uganda and the Lords Resistance Army as well as the cattle rustling conflict that lasted for 20 years.

Since the war ended in 2006, the internally displaced person camps have been destroyed and people have resettled back to their former homesteads. The region, however, still has many health challenges, such as poor health care infrastructure and inadequate staffing at all levels (2008 published report); lack of access to the national electricity grid (2007 published report); an inability to attract and retain qualified staff; frequent stock outs in the hospitals and health facilities; emerging and re-emerging diseases such as Ebola, nodding syndrome, onchocerciasis, and tuberculosis; proneness to malaria epidemics, the leading cause of death in the country; reintegration of former abducted child soldiers who returned home (2007 study); lack of safe drinking water as most boreholes were destroyed during the war; the HIV/AIDS epidemic (2004 published report); poor education standards with high failure rates in primary and secondary school national examinations (2015 published report); and poverty (2013 published report).

Refugees
Uganda has been hosting refugees and asylum seekers since achieving its independence in 1962. In fact, the 2016 United Nations Summit for Refugees declared Uganda's refugee policy a model. The 2006 Refugee Act and 2010 Refugee Regulations allow for integration of refugees within host communities with refugees
having access to the same public services as nationals. They have freedom of movement and are free to pursue livelihood opportunities, including access
to the labour market and to establish businesses.
Uganda is currently hosting 1,252,470 refugees and asylum seekers making it the largest refugee hosting country in Africa and the third largest in the world (GoU and UNHCR, 2017) UNDP. This has placed a huge burden on the country that has a GDP per capita of just 710 dollars, yet the aid received per person is very small. "Aid received per person against income" 
Cost disaggregated by sector

There are regular outbreaks of diseases such as cholera, ebola and marburg. 2017 Uganda Marburg virus outbreak. The policy of allowing refugees to freely move within the country increases the risk of spreading these outbreaks beyond refugee camp borders.

Health indicators

According to the 2015 Uganda Bureau of Statistics (UBOS) report:
 The region has one of the highest HIV prevalence rates of 8 percent in the country, second only to Kampala. 
 The region leads in poverty with 80 percent of households living below poverty line compared to only 20 percent of the country in general living in poverty. The region has the lowest per capita house hold expenditure of USh.21,000/= compared to USh.30,000/= of the general population. Up to 26 percent of people are chronically poor 
 The region leads in illiteracy with only 60 percent of the population aged 10 years and above being literate compared to 71 percent of the general country population. 
 Most districts in the region lack clean piped water supply with the exception of a few urban centers like Gulu, Lira, Arua, and Soroti. The pit latrine coverage ranges from 4 to 84 percent in some districts, the worst in the country.
 The region has the lowest numbers of health facilities compared to other regions of the country. Of the total 5,229 health facilities in Uganda (2,867 operated by the government, 874 operated by non-governmental organizations (NGOs), and 1,488 private facilities), there are only 788 health facilities in the Northern Region (664 operated by government, 122 operated by NGOs, and 2 private facilities). Health facility deliveries range from 7 percent in Amudat, to 81 percent in Gulu.
 The region has the highest total fertility rate of 7.9 children per woman compared to the nationwide 6.1 rate.
 The Karamoja sub-region has high maternal mortality ratios. According to the 2001 Uganda Demographic and Health Survey, the Northern Region was the worst in infant child mortality indicators (under age five mortality: 178 deaths per 1000 live births) (under age one mortality: 105 deaths per 1000 live births) (neonatal mortality: 42 deaths within the first month of life per 1000 live births). For purposes of the 2011 Uganda Demographic and Health Survey, the Northern Region was subdivided into West Nile, North, and Karamoja, with the other three regions having seven subdivisions, for a total of ten subdivisions nationwide. Karamoja's under age five mortality rate (153 deaths per 1000 live births) was the worst in the country, with West Nile's rate (125) the third worst and the North's rate (105) the fourth best. West Nile's under age one mortality rate (88) was the worst in the country, with Karamoja's rate (87) the second worst and the North's rate (66) the fifth best. West Nile's under one month mortality rate (38) was the second worst in the country, with the North's rate (31) tied for fourth worst and Karamoja's rate (29) being the fourth best.
 Nodding syndrome hit the region during the early to mid-2000s, although the international community did not become aware of it until 2009 when the WHO and the US Centers for Disease Control and Prevention first investigated it. The disease affected children aged 5–15 years, mainly in the Acholi sub-region and a few in the Lango sub-region. Over 3,000 confirmed cases were documented as of 2012, with Uganda having the highest number of cases in the world. The disease has profound health effects on children, families, and communities. The children who were previously healthy and growing well are observed by the parents to nod mainly at meal times initially, progressing to head nod when it is cold, etc. These children eventually develop various forms of epileptic seizures as well as disabilities such as severe malnutrition, burns, contractures, severe kyphosis, cognitive impairment, and wandering away from homes. Since the interventions began in 2012, there have been no new cases reported in the region. The exact cause of this disease has not been found, although there is strong association with onchocerciasis. Communities believe their children could have been exposed to chemicals during the war, particularly when they were displaced into internally displaced persons camps because they observed that their children became sick only when in the camps.

Environmental pollution in Uganda

Air pollution 
Air pollution is one of the  critical risk factor for non-communicable diseases in Uganda. Globally, air pollution is responsible for about 18% of all adult deaths from stroke, 27% from heart disease, 20% from Chronic obstructive pulmonary disease (COPD), 27% are due to pneumonia and 8% from lung cancer, WHO estimates show. A total of about 13,000 people died from air pollution in Uganda in 2017 and 10,000 of the deaths were due to inhaling toxic fumes from indoor wood and charcoal burning cookstoves household air pollution figures from the Health Effects Institute (HEI), Institute for Health Metrics and Evaluation (IHME) and World Health Organization (WHO) reveal . In 2019, it was the year when Kampala was reported to have the highest air pollution where the months that stood out as the most polluted were February, July and August, all of which came in with PM2.5 readings of 36.9 μg/m³, 39.9 μg/m³ and 37.4 μg/m³ respectively with black carbon and volatile organic compounds (VOC's) being the most pollutant.

In 2019, Dr Daniel Okello, the KCCA director of Public Health and Environment also reported about 31,600 people die in Uganda from air pollution-related diseases annually like heart disease, chronic obstructive pulmonary disease and lung cancer, and most fatalities are in dusty communities, industrial and commercial areas, that have too many cars gushing fumes and dust. Another research conducted by Makerere University stated that an increase in the number of old vehicles on roads has led to the deterioration of the air quality far beyond the World Health Organization’s recommended levels. Air pollution is fundamentally altering climate, with profound impacts on the health of  not only of Uganda but the planet at large and it is driven by rapid urbanization and population growth in urban areas.

Water access and pollution 
In Uganda, an estimate of about 7 million of Ugandans lack access to safe water and about 28 millions of the population do not have sufficient access to sanitation facilities. In 2022, it was reported by The Joint Monitoring Programme (JMP), the United Nations and World Health Organization’s (WHO)  that 9 percent of the Ugandan population depends on unimproved or surface water for their daily needs. In Kampala, the major cause of water pollution is the presence of pathogenic bacteria in the springs and presence of nitrates as found out by researchers. This is said to be caused by poor waste management and badly designed pit latrines. Children between the ages of 12 to 14 that have come into contact with nitrates-containing water are reported to have delayed response to light and sound stimuli. Diarrhoea alone, one of  the effects clean water inaccessibility and one of three major childhood killers in Uganda, kills 33 children every day UNICEF reports. There is as well a lot of plastic waste in Lake Victoria. Polyethene and plastic bottles, often used in bags, wrappers and films, contributes 60% of analyzed microplastic particles, thus making it the biggest of the plastic pollutants of Lake Victoria.

See also
Water supply and sanitation in Uganda
Healthcare in Uganda
Child health in Uganda
HIV/AIDS in Uganda
COVID-19 pandemic in Uganda

References

Notes
UBOS and ICF International. Uganda Demographic and Health Survey 2011. Kampala, Uganda and Calverton, Maryland: Uganda Bureau of Statistics (UBOS) and ICF International Inc., 2012
Uganda Bureau of Statistics (UBOS) and Macro International Inc. Uganda Demographic and Health Survey 2006. Calverton, Maryland, US: UBOS and Macro International Inc, 2007
MOH and ICF International. Uganda AIDS Indicator Survey 2011. Kampala, Uganda and Calverton Maryland, US: Ministry of Health and ICF International, 2012
MOH and ORC Macro. Uganda HIV/AIDS Sero-behavioural Survey 2004–2005. Calverton, Maryland, US: Ministry of Health and ORC Macro, 2006.
Government of Uganda MOH. Safe Male Circumcision Policy. In: Ministry of Health, editor. Kampala 2010
Population Reference Bureau. 2014 World Population Data sheet. Washington DC, US: PRB; 2014 [www.prb.org]
Population Reference Bureau. 2012 World Population Data sheet. Washington DC, US: PRB; 2012 [www.prb.org]
Population Reference Bureau. 2013 World Population Data sheet. Washington DC, US: PRB; 2013 [www.prb.org]

External links
The State of the World's Midwifery – Uganda Country Profile 
 Film on Gideon Byamugisha and his fight against HIV stigma in Uganda